The International Journal of Medical Sciences is a peer-reviewed open access medical journal published by Ivyspring International Publisher covering research in basic medical sciences. Articles include original research papers, reviews, and short research communications. Full text of published articles is archived in PubMed Central. The current editor-in-chief is Dennis D. Taub (National Institute on Aging).

Abstracting and indexing 
The journal is abstracted and indexed in:

According to the Journal Citation Reports, the journal has a 2016 impact factor of 2.399.

References

External links 
 

Open access journals
English-language journals
Publications established in 2004
General medical journals
Ivyspring International Publisher journals